The Canadian Centre for Alternatives to Animal Methods (CCAAM) and its subsidiary, the Canadian Centre for the Validation of Alternative Methods (CaCVAM), is a research centre founded in 2017 and based at the University of Windsor, in Canada. Its goal is “to develop, validate, and promote laboratory methods and techniques that don’t use animal test subjects”. It is the first centre in Canada dedicated to non-animal testing and the promotion of human-relevant alternatives.

Mission and projects
The CCAAM's mission is based on three pillars:
 scientific research relying exclusively on human-based biomaterials and human biology-based methodologies, including human cells, stem cells, tissues from cadavers, biopsies, and explanted organs from surgeries;
 academic training for scientists, ethicists, regulators, and policy makers, including development of a one-year masters programme;
 regulatory initiatives for changing chemical safety methods in Canada, with academic, industry, government, and public partnerships.
One of its main focuses of research is diabetes, using “human stem cells to create diabetes in a dish”.The CCAAM is opposed to animal testing based on ethical and scientific reasons. The director, biochemist Dr. Charu Chandrasekera who specializes in heart disease and diabetes, states that “Ninety-five per cent of drugs tested to be safe and effective in animal models fail in human clinical trials”.

Funding
In 2018, it received a $1 million donation from the Eric S. Margolis Family Foundation, considered “the largest research donation in University of Windsor history”, part of which will be used to create a research and training facility.

See also
 Alternatives to animal testing
 Center for Alternatives to Animal Testing
 Pain and suffering in laboratory animals
 Animal testing regulations

References 

Animal testing techniques
Laboratory techniques
Human subject research
University of Windsor